Alan Reid (born 30 June 1931) is an Australian cricketer. He played in one first-class match for Queensland in 1957/58.

See also
 List of Queensland first-class cricketers

References

External links
 

1931 births
Living people
Australian cricketers
Queensland cricketers
People from Maryborough, Queensland
Cricketers from Queensland